Rhigognostis schmaltzella is a moth of the family Plutellidae. It is found in Estonia, Latvia, Fennoscandia and Germany.

The wingspan is 17–20 mm.

External links
 Fauna Europaea
 Swedish Moths

Plutellidae
Moths of Europe
Moths described in 1839